The cavernous portion of the urethra is narrow, and of uniform size in the body of the penis, measuring about 6 mm in diameter; it is dilated behind, within the bulb, and again anteriorly within the glans penis, where it forms the fossa navicularis urethrae.

The navicular fossa is the spongy part of the male urethra located at the glans penis portion. It is essentially the part right before the external urethral orifice. It is lined by stratified squamous, non-keratinizing epithelium when viewed histologically.

During development, the glans of the penis is initially solid but cannulates to give rise to the navicular fossa.

References

External links
  - "The Male Pelvis: The Urethra"
 

Male urethra